Larry "Woodrow" Woody is a retired sports writer for The Tennessean, the morning newspaper in Nashville, Tennessee. He is a three-time winner of the Tennessee Sports Writer of the Year award and is the author of several books, including Along For The Ride.

Woody covered NASCAR from the early 1960s to late 2007 in addition to SEC sports, minor league baseball, the Tennessee Titans, and the Vanderbilt Commodores. The first NASCAR race he ever attended, he reluctantly covered.

He was inducted into the Martin Methodist College Sports Hall Of Fame, part of the 2001-2002 class.

Woody took early retirement from The Tennessean in August, 2007.

Tony Stewart Controversy

During 2001-2002, Cup driver Tony Stewart had several negative encounters with the media. One of these included Larry Woody, who went over the incident in depth in his book Along For The Ride.

After the 2001 Sharpie 500 at Bristol Motor Speedway in which Stewart won after a duel with Jeff Gordon. The year before, Gordon had defeated Stewart and the two traded a lot of paint which prompted Stewart to intentionally bump into Gordon on pit road afterward leading to his first of many fines. During the post-race press conference following the 2001 victory, Woody asked Stewart if the 2000 battle had crossed his mind during the closing laps. Stewart asked Woody if he was a "local" and the two traded a few more words before the driver said "Look, if you've got a question I wish you'd go ahead and ask it. I'd like to get out of here sometime tonight!" Woody repeated the question and an angry Stewart (whom Woody described in the book as being "accustomed to intimidating the media" and not used to one of them "refusing to be intimidated and standing up to him".) NASCAR official Danielle Humphrey ended up stepping in between, asking "Any further questions for Tony?"

Books
 Dixie Farewell: The Life and Death of Chucky Mullins (1994) Eggman Publishing. 
 Pure Sterling: The Sterling Marlin Story (1995) Eggman Publishing. 
 Sterling Marlin: The Silver Bullet (2002) 
 Sterling Marlin: Heading Into The Turn (2002) 
 Along for the Ride: A Collection of Stories from the Fast and Furious World of NASCAR (2003) Sports Publishing LLC. 
 Marx Martin: Marx Of Excellence (2004) Sports Publishing LLC.

References

External links
 "Woody Is Missed" (Chattanooga Times Free Press, Lindsey Young)
 Review of Along For The Ride - SpeedTV.com
 Review of Along For The Ride - Trouble In Turn Three
 Larry Woody ranks the Top 10 Daytona 500 races
 Larry Woody, Coverage of Darrell Waltrip's Victory Tour (2000)

American sportswriters
NASCAR mass media
People from Nashville, Tennessee
Living people
Year of birth missing (living people)